is a 1997 V-Cinema erotic thriller film, starring Mai Tachihara. It is the fourth installment in the Zero Woman film series.

Plot synopsis
Rei, an undercover agent for the Zero Department, is on a mission to investigate the multiple murders of men. While out, she meets Mitsuru, a male prostitute. Rei decides to have him live with her. But Rei is suspicious of Mitsuru's behavior and wonders if he is involved with the murders.

Cast

Japanese cast
 Mai Tachihara as Rei
 Yûjin Kitagawa as Mitsuru
 Shinji Yamashita as Muto
 Ayana Inoue as Reiko Sato
 Eini Oshiro as Detective
 Daisuke Yamazaki as Bar Patron
 Reiko Kojima
 Eisaku Shindo
 Hajime Tsukumo
 Tetsu Watanabe

English voice cast
 Marcia Belle as Rei
 Michael Tremain as Mitsuru
 Matthew Jay as Muto
 Kandi Snackwell as Reiko Sato
 Tom Wilson as Detective
 Paul Hertel as Bar Patron

Release
The film was released direct-to-video on April 4, 1997 in Japan. It was later re-released on DVD on November 11, 2000. Central Park Media licensed the film under their Asia Pulp Cinema label and was released on VHS on June 24, 2000 as an edited version and unedited VHS was released on April 10, 2001 . The film was re-released on DVD on May 13, 2003 with an English dub. The dub was produced by Matlin Recording in New York City.

See also
 Girls with guns
 Zero Woman, for other films in the franchise

References

External links
 

1990s erotic thriller films
1997 direct-to-video films
1997 films
Central Park Media
Direct-to-video erotic thriller films
Girls with guns films
Japanese direct-to-video films
Japanese erotic thriller films
1990s Japanese films
1990s Japanese-language films